Bendoura is a locality in the Queanbeyan–Palerang Regional Council, New South Wales, Australia. It is located about 20 km southwest of Braidwood on the road to Cooma and on the eastern bank of the Shoalhaven River.

References

Localities in New South Wales
Queanbeyan–Palerang Regional Council
Southern Tablelands